Nigel James Smart (born 21 May 1969) is a former Australian rules footballer who played for the Adelaide Football Club in the Australian Football League (AFL). Smart played as a defender, and he was part of Adelaide's inaugural team in the 1991 AFL season. He was a two-time premiership player, a three-time All-Australian, and the first person to play 250 matches for Adelaide.

Following his retirement, he worked in football administration. He was the Adelaide Football Club's chief operating officer from 2013 to 2020 and was part of the club's decision to move into eSports.

Early life
Smart was raised in the southern suburbs of Adelaide, South Australia. He studied a Bachelor of Arts at Flinders University, majoring in geography and politics.

Smart made his senior football debut in 1988 while at university, playing for South Adelaide in the SANFL.

AFL career
Smart was in the Adelaide Football Club's squad for their inaugural season in 1991. Smart was named at full-back for Adelaide's Round One match against Hawthorn, lining up against Hawthorn's full-forward Jason Dunstall. During the match, Smart had six kicks and nine handballs and took six marks. At the end of the 1991 season, Smart became Adelaide's first ever All-Australian, selected in the back pocket.

During the 1992 pre-season, Adelaide went on a pre-season camp in Rapid Bay. As part of the camp, a motivational speaker encouraged the players to walk over hot coals for each other. Smart was the first to do so, and suffered blisters and first-degree burns on the soles of his feet. Bob Hammond, the club's chairman, was present, and after seeing Smart's injuries from walking over the coals he called off the exercise. Smart recovered from the burns and played in a practice match less than a week later.

Smart was one of the key players in Adelaide's resurgence under coach Malcolm Blight. He was the team's vice captain (with Mark Bickley as the team's captain) in 1997 and 1998, when the team won back-to-back premierships. In the 1997 AFL Grand Final against St Kilda, he kicked the final goal of the match as Adelaide won their first AFL premiership. He also played in Adelaide's win in the 1998 AFL Grand Final, when the Crows became the first team to win back-to-back premierships since the competition was re-named to the AFL in 1990.

In the first part of Smart's career, he was not a full-time footballer. Through the Crows' premiership years Smart trained with the teams three times a week and spent most of his time at day jobs to supplement his income. He worked in sales and management, first for South Australian Brewing Company, then for Toyota. Smart retired from football at the end of the 2004 AFL season.

AFL statistics

|- style="background-color: #EAEAEA"
! scope="row" style="text-align:center" | 1991
|style="text-align:center;"|
| 7 || 20 || 2 || 1 || 139 || 123 || 262 || 47 || 28 || 0.1 || 0.1 || 7.0 || 6.2 || 13.1 || 2.4 || 1.4
|-
! scope="row" style="text-align:center" | 1992
|style="text-align:center;"|
| 7 || 17 || 0 || 2 || 131 || 109 || 240 || 35 || 31 || 0.0 || 0.1 || 7.7 || 6.4 || 14.1 || 2.1 || 1.8
|- style="background-color: #EAEAEA"
! scope="row" style="text-align:center" | 1993
|style="text-align:center;"|
| 7 || 22 || 23 || 17 || 220 || 136 || 356 || 81 || 38 || 1.0 || 0.8 || 10.0 || 6.2 || 16.2 || 3.7 || 1.7
|-
! scope="row" style="text-align:center" | 1994
|style="text-align:center;"|
| 7 || 17 || 13 || 19 || 123 || 87 || 210 || 56 || 22 || 0.8 || 1.1 || 7.2 || 5.1 || 12.4 || 3.3 || 1.3
|- style="background-color: #EAEAEA"
! scope="row" style="text-align:center" | 1995
|style="text-align:center;"|
| 7 || 22 || 14 || 6 || 189 || 152 || 341 || 59 || 49 || 0.6 || 0.3 || 8.6 || 6.9 || 15.5 || 2.7 || 2.2
|-
! scope="row" style="text-align:center" | 1996
|style="text-align:center;"|
| 7 || 22 || 7 || 8 || 208 || 116 || 324 || 55 || 57 || 0.3 || 0.4 || 9.5 || 5.3 || 14.7 || 2.5 || 2.6
|- style="background-color: #EAEAEA"
! scope="row" style="text-align:center;" | 1997
|style="text-align:center;"|
| 7 || 22 || 13 || 8 || 253 || 88 || 341 || 84 || 47 || 0.6 || 0.4 || 11.5 || 4.0 || 15.5 || 3.8 || 2.1
|-
! scope="row" style="text-align:center;" | 1998
|style="text-align:center;"|
| 7 || 24 || 13 || 12 || 304 || 122 || 426 || 88 || 80 || 0.5 || 0.5 || 12.7 || 5.1 || 17.8 || 3.7 || 3.3
|- style="background-color: #EAEAEA"
! scope="row" style="text-align:center" | 1999
|style="text-align:center;"|
| 7 || 21 || 12 || 10 || 217 || 117 || 334 || 69 || 30 || 0.6 || 0.5 || 10.3 || 5.6 || 15.9 || 3.3 || 1.4
|-
! scope="row" style="text-align:center" | 2000
|style="text-align:center;"|
| 7 || 18 || 3 || 1 || 178 || 115 || 293 || 58 || 28 || 0.2 || 0.1 || 9.9 || 6.4 || 16.3 || 3.2 || 1.6
|- style="background-color: #EAEAEA"
! scope="row" style="text-align:center" | 2001
|style="text-align:center;"|
| 7 || 23 || 7 || 11 || 223 || 133 || 356 || 78 || 43 || 0.3 || 0.5 || 9.7 || 5.8 || 15.5 || 3.4 || 1.9
|-
! scope="row" style="text-align:center" | 2002
|style="text-align:center;"|
| 7 || 23 || 3 || 3 || 150 || 109 || 259 || 63 || 44 || 0.1 || 0.1 || 6.5 || 4.7 || 11.3 || 2.7 || 1.9
|- style="background-color: #EAEAEA"
! scope="row" style="text-align:center" | 2003
|style="text-align:center;"|
| 7 || 21 || 3 || 5 || 133 || 125 || 258 || 57 || 36 || 0.1 || 0.2 || 6.3 || 6.0 || 12.3 || 2.7 || 1.7
|-
! scope="row" style="text-align:center" | 2004
|style="text-align:center;"|
| 7 || 6 || 3 || 1 || 35 || 21 || 56 || 14 || 11 || 0.5 || 0.2 || 5.8 || 3.5 || 9.3 || 2.3 || 1.8
|- class="sortbottom"
! colspan=3| Career
! 278
! 0.4
! 0.4
! 2503
! 1553
! 4056
! 844
! 544
! 131
! 116
! 9.0
! 5.6
! 14.6
! 3.0
! 2.0
|}

After AFL
After his retirement from football, Smart lived for a period of time in Canada and France. He returned to Adelaide, and was an unsuccessful candidate for the Liberal Party for the electoral district of Norwood in the 2006 South Australian state election. After his failure in the election, he worked for a disability organisation called Disability Works, then returned to university to study a Master of Business Administration at the University of Adelaide.

Upon retiring from football, Smart also became a member of the Adelaide Football Club's board of directors in 2005. He served as deputy chairman to Bill Sanders in 2009 and in 2013 became the club's chief operating officer. In 2017, he was part of the club's decision to enter into eSports, which became a source of sponsorship for the club. Smart ceased working at the club in 2020.

In August 2021, Smart became the chief executive officer of Crime Stoppers South Australia.

References

Adelaide Football Club players
Adelaide Football Club Premiership players
1969 births
Living people
All-Australians (AFL)
South Adelaide Football Club players
South Australian State of Origin players
Australian rules footballers from South Australia
South Australian Football Hall of Fame inductees
Christies Beach Football Club players
Australia international rules football team players
Two-time VFL/AFL Premiership players